Melinda Bam (born 13 May 1989) is a South African TV Personality, presenting popular TV show Pasella & Wies Jou Poppie (season 1–3), international model and beauty pageant titleholder who was crowned Miss South Africa 2011, becoming the official representative of her country to Miss Universe 2012. She has a swimwear line called Bambshell, for which she worked with South African swimwear brand.

Early life
Melinda Bam (born Melinda de Kock) was raised in Pretoria. Her father, Deon de Kock, was a minister of the Dutch Reformed Church who killed himself in 1999 after he and Melinda's mom, gospel singer Wanda de Kock, were divorced earlier in the year. He had only served one congregation, Glenharvie, which merged with Westonaria in 1996, where after he was retrenched. Melinda was born in 1989 and has two sisters, Melissa Swart and Sybil Bam. She is a model and studied B.Com. Marketing at the University of Pretoria. She entered Miss South Africa 2011 and won the pageant on her first attempt.

Miss South Africa 2011
She was crowned Miss South Africa 2011 at an event held at the Sun City Super Bowl on 11 December 2011.

Miss Universe 2012
Melinda Bam represented South Africa in December at Miss Universe 2012, which was held in Las Vegas, and placed among the top 10.

She did not participate in the Miss World 2012 pageant because if a contestant reaches the top three of the pageant she is not permitted to enter Miss Universe. The 1st princess Remona Moodley represented South Africa at Miss World 2012 instead.

Miss South Africa national executive
In June 2013 it was announced that Melinda Bam was appointed as nstional executive for the Miss South Africa Pageant, and she would be in charge of arranging potential sponsors for the pageant, as well as preparing the outgoing queens to both the Miss World and Miss Universe pageants. Her management proved successful and partly due to her guidance, secured the crown for 2014 Miss World titleholder Rolene Strauss.

Personal life

Her family name is of German origin. However, Bam is also a Xhosa name, making the public mistake her for a Xhosa girl before she won the title.
Bam announced in November 2013 that she is engaged to Mr South Africa 2011, Adriaan Bergh. The two former beauty pageant title carriers got engaged during a holiday in Dubai. They were married in November 2014 at Oakfield Farm, Gauteng, South Africa.

References

External links

 
 Official Melinda Bam Page on Facebook
 Official Miss South Africa website

1989 births
Living people
Afrikaner people
South African people of German descent
Miss South Africa winners
University of Pretoria alumni
Miss Universe 2012 contestants
People from Pretoria
South African beauty pageant winners